Ruisseau-Ferguson is an unorganized territory in the Gaspésie–Îles-de-la-Madeleine region of Quebec, Canada.

It is named after the Ferguson Creek that is a left tributary of the Restigouche River. The territory's western boundary is the Patapédia River.

Demographics

Population

See also
 List of unorganized territories in Quebec

References

Unorganized territories in Gaspésie-Îles-de-la-Madeleine